Ute Oberhoffner ( Weiß, born 15 September 1961 in Ilmenau, Bezirk Suhl, sometimes shown as Ute Oberhoffner-Weiss) is an East German luger who competed during the 1980s. She won two medals in the women's singles event at the Winter Olympics with a silver in 1988 and a bronze in 1984.

Oberhoffner won four medals at the FIL World Luge Championships, earning one silver (Mixed team: 1989) and three bronzes (1983, 1987, 1989). She won a complete set of medals at the FIL European Luge Championships with a gold in the women's singles event (1988), and silver in the mixed team event (1988), and a bronze in the women's singles event (1986). Oberhoffner also won the overall Luge World Cup title in women's singles twice (1982-3, 1988-9).

After her career in luge, Oberhoffner became a teacher in her native Ilmenau for which she was honored in 2003.

References
2003 speech honoring Oberhoffner 

Kluge, Volker. (2000). Das große Lexikon der DDR-Sportler. Berlin: Schwarzkopf & Schwarzkopf. 
 

 

1961 births
Living people
People from Ilmenau
People from Bezirk Suhl
German female lugers
Sportspeople from Thuringia
National People's Army military athletes
Olympic lugers of East Germany
Lugers at the 1984 Winter Olympics
Lugers at the 1988 Winter Olympics
Olympic silver medalists for East Germany
Olympic bronze medalists for East Germany
Olympic medalists in luge
Medalists at the 1984 Winter Olympics
Medalists at the 1988 Winter Olympics
Recipients of the Patriotic Order of Merit in silver
Recipients of the Cross of the Order of Merit of the Federal Republic of Germany
20th-century German women